New York Cosmos B were an American soccer team based in the New York metropolitan area that played in the National Premier Soccer League, the fourth tier of the United States soccer league system, as the reserve team of New York Cosmos.

History
The club was announced on January 15, 2015. On February 10, 2015, Alecko Eskandarian, assistant coach for the senior squad, was named head coach of Cosmos B.

In the club's inaugural season, Cosmos B did not lose a game. On August 8, Cosmos B capped the undefeated season by defeating Chattanooga FC 3-2 at Finley Stadium to win the NPSL National Championship. Following the successful season, then-Cosmos Chief Operating Officer Erik Stover stated that while the team was eligible for the U.S. Open Cup, since a new tournament rule at the time only barred professional teams that were majority owned by a higher-level professional league teams from taking part in the competition and not amateur ones, it would not take part and explained that "the integrity of the tournament is more important."

On February 2, 2016, Fernando Barboto was named head coach of Cosmos B.  He was replaced by Kevin Anderson for the 2017 season

Following the cancellation of the 2018 NASL season and subsequent lawsuit between the league and the USSF, the New York Cosmos main team went on hiatus while fielding Cosmos B in the NPSL and exploring options for the 2019 season. In the interim, the team named former Cosmos team captain Carlos Mendes as team captain and moved some of the main team's players over to Cosmos B.

With no first team, the group began seeking a berth into the 2018 Lamar Hunt U.S. Open Cup but was originally not permitted to compete in the competition. This was due to the fact that the B hadn't finished the 2017 season in a high enough position to be allocated a spot while the first team had neither a professional league to play in and had been league-less at the deadline set by U.S. Soccer. Following an appeal, Cosmos B was allowed to enter through a play-in round with the Jacksonville Armada FC and Miami FC 2. The team fell to the Brooklyn Italians, 3-2, in the play-in round on May 6, 2018.

On December 13, 2019, the New York Cosmos announced that the team had been admitted into the National Independent Soccer Association for the Fall 2020 season. This included the fact that no Cosmos team would take part in the 2020 U.S. Open Cup despite the B team automatically qualifying due to its appearance in the national final. This was confirmed on January 8, 2020, when U.S. Soccer announced the 100 teams taking part in the tournament.

Record

Year-by-year

Honors

League

See also 
 Soccer in New York City

References

External links
New York Cosmos
NPSL team website

New York Cosmos
Association football clubs established in 2015
Reserve soccer teams in the United States
2015 establishments in New York (state)
Soccer clubs in the New York metropolitan area
National Premier Soccer League teams